Michałowski (feminine: Michałowska, plural: Michałowscy) is a Polish surname. It may refer to:

Aleksander Michałowski (born 1851), Polish pianist, pedagogue and composer
Kazimierz Michałowski (1901–1981), Polish archaeologist and Egyptologist, founder of Nubiology
Mark Michalowski (born 1963), the editor of Shout
Piotr Michałowski (1800–1855), Polish painter of the Romantic period, known for portraits
Wiktor Michałowski (died 1973), Polish Army officer who worked at the interbellum Polish Cipher Bureau's German section, B.S.-4

See also
7747 Michałowski, main belt asteroid

Polish-language surnames
Surnames from given names